Reginald Arthur King (31 August 1927 – 21 August 2009) was an  association football player who represented New Zealand at international level.

Club career
King won six Auckland championships with Eastern Suburbs and won the Chatham Cup in 1951 and 1953, and was a losing finalist in 1955. He scored a hat-trick in the 1951 final.

International career
King was part of the 1954 New Zealand side which toured Australia. After being left out of the starting XI for the first game against a State side, he was given his chance against an Australian select XI in the second, and duly delivered with hat-trick in the 3-0 win. King's performance earned him a start for his only official A-international appearance for New Zealand. King scored the first of New Zealand's goals, Charlie Steele, Jr. the other in the 2-1 victory over Australia on 14 August 1954. King suffered a knee injury late in the first half and was unable to take any further part in the tour. Including unofficial matches, King played 6 times for New Zealand, scoring eight goals.

References 

1927 births
2009 deaths
New Zealand association footballers
New Zealand international footballers
Association footballers from Auckland
Association football forwards